The Uruguayan Sworn Translators Association (CTPU) is a Uruguayan translation association.

Established in 1950, it is affiliated with the International Federation of Translators (FIT-IFT).

Conferences
 The First International Translation and Interpreting Conference was held in September 2011.
 The Second International Translation and Interpreting Conference will be held in September 2017.

References

External links 
 CTPU website

Professional associations based in Uruguay
Uruguay
 
Organizations established in 1950
1950 establishments in Uruguay